Khadijah Hashim (born 20 April 1942 in Batu Pahat, Johor, Malaysia) is a Malaysian writer, teacher and journalist. She has worked as a teacher and also as a journalist with local newspapers Utusan Melayu (1974–1976) and Berita Harian (1976–1985). She is better known as a novelist, and has produced 19 novels. She also expanded her creativity in the field of short stories, radio drama scripts, children's books, rhymes and poetry. The children's rhyme book  "Sayang Sayang"  has been selected to be on Honour List of the International Board on Books for Young People (IBBY) in Basel, Switzerland (2002) and  "Semerbak Poetry" in Macau, China (2006). Khadijah continues her interests in writing rhymes, which led to her latest creation of "Putera-puteri Malaysia".

Several of Khadijah's short stories and novels have been adapted to TV dramas. Amongst them were "Mawar Merah di Jambangan", "Sekapur Sirih Segeluk Air", "Ditepi Pagar", and "Badai Semalam" and "Dekat Disayang Jauh Dikenang" novels.  "Laila Azwa Gadisku" novel was adapted to television film. Meanwhile, "Mira Edora" and "Pelangi Pagi" novels have been made into movie films with the title of "Mira Edora" and "Bicara Hati" respectively.

Her first and one of her best-known novel "Badai Semalam" (1968) was used as school textbook in Singapore and Malaysia. The novel has been translated into English, "Storms of Yesterday", by Mahani Abdul Hamid in 1991 and Spanish, "Tormentos del ayer", by Alberto Balanza and Yahia in 2010.  "Badai Semalam" was republished several times and the latest was in 2006 by Alaf 21 in the nostalgic novel series. The English version was also republished in 2009 by Institut Terjemahan Negara Malaysia under the Malaysian Literature Series.

“Merpati Putih Terbang Lagi" novel won a consolation prize in a writing contest in the celebration of ten years of Malaysia's independence. The novel has also been translated into Japanese by Tatsun Hoshino. "Exiled" novel has been nominated for the International Dublin Literary Award in 1997. Her "Langkah Pertama" novel has won the Mobil-MABOPA Children's Book Award in 1995. Khadijah was the recipient of Southeast Asian Writers Award in 1999 and had undergone the International Writing Program at Iowa University in 1994. Her children's story book series, "Siri Lagenda", "Siri Aura dan Fauna" and "Siri Teladan dari Rimba"  have been translated into English by the Institut Terjemahan Negara Malaysia (2009).

Novels
 Badai Semalam, Singapura: Pustaka Nasional, 1968, 201 pages.
 Jalan ke Kubur, Singapura: Pustaka Nasional, 1969, 139 pages.
 Pelangi pagi, Johor Baru, Penerbitan Penamas Malaysia, 1971, 133 pages.
 Merpati Putih Terbang lagi, Kuala Lumpur: Dewan Bahasa dan Pustaka, 1972, 289 pages.
 Belum Masanya, Kuala Lumpur: Penerbitan Utusan Melayu (M) Bhd., 1976, 96 pages.
 Di Tengah Kabus, Singapura: Pustaka Nasional, 1980, 123 pages.
 Bila dan di Mana, Kuala Lumpur: Dewan Bahasa dan Pustaka, 1981, 199 pages.
 Mira Edora, Kuala Lumpur: K Publishing Sdn Bhd, 1984
 Dekat Disayang Jauh Dikenang, Petaling Jaya: `K’ Publishing & Distributors Sdn. Bhd., 1984, 133 pages.
 Laila Azwa Gadisku, Kuala Lumpur: `K’ Publishing & Distributors Sdn. Bhd., 1986, 144 pages.
 Cinta Kedua, Kuala Lumpur: `K’ Publishing & Distributors Sdn. Bhd., 1989
 Alun Hidup, Kuala Lumpur: ‘K’ Publishing & Distributors, 1990, 217 pages.
 Di Ruangmu Aku di Sini, Kuala Lumpur: ‘K’ Publishing & Distributors, 1992
 Ke Mana Kasih Hendak Dibawa, Kuala Lumpur: ‘K’ Publishing & Distributors, 1993, 133 pages.
 Melawan Arus, ‘K’ Publishing & Distributors, 1993, 229 pages.
 Senator Adila,Kuala Lumpur: ‘K’ Publishing & Distributors 1993
 Langkah Pertama, Kuala Lumpur: ‘K’ Publishing & Distributors, 1994, 126 pages.
 Fasa Kedua, Kuala Lumpur: ‘K’ Publishing & Distributors, 1995
 Mencari Azizah, Kuala Lumpur: ‘K’ Publishing & Distributors, 1998

Short stories
 Segeluk Air, Kuala Lumpur: Dewan Bahasa dan Pustaka, 1974, 142 pages.
 Koleksi Cerpen-cerpen Malaysia (antologi bersama), Kuala Lumpur: Penerbitan Universiti Malaya, 1977, 446 pages.
 Cerpen-cerpen ASEAN (antologi bersama), Kuala Lumpur: Dewan Bahasa dan Pustaka, 1978, 279 pages.
 Aku Anak Menteri, Petaling Jaya: Penerbitan Fajar Bakti Sdn. Bhd. 1980, 73 pages.
 Batas Menanti, Kuala Lumpur: Eastern Universities Press (M) Sdn. Bhd., 1982, 95 pages.
 Hawa (antologi bersama), Kuala Lumpur: Dewan Bahasa dan Pustaka, 1984, 250 pages.
 Angin Senja, Petaling Jaya: ‘K’ Publishing & Distributors Sdn. Bhd.. 1985. 93 pages.
 Bujang Kota, Kuala Lumpur: ‘K’ Publishing & Distributors Sdn. Bhd., 1985, 144 pages.
 Dongeng Merdeka (antologi bersama), Petaling Jaya : Penerbit Fajar Bakti Sdn. Bhd., 1985, 339 pages.
 Alun Menggulung Perlahan (antologi bersama), Petaling Jaya : Penerbit Fajar Bakti Sdn. Bhd., 1986, 286 pages.
 Kasih Entah di Mana, Kuala Lumpur: ‘K’ Publishing & Distributors Sdn. Bhd., 2001
 Mawar Merah di Jambagan, Kuala Lumpur: ‘K’ Publishing & Distributors Sdn. Bhd., 2001

Short Stories for Youths
 Mawar Merah di Jambangan, Petaling Jaya: Penerbit Fajar Bakti Sdn. Bhd., 1979, 129 pages.
 Angin dari Sawah, Petaling Jaya: Penerbit Fajar Sdn. Bhd., 1980, 95 pages.
 Arnizah (Peny. bersama Othman Puteh) Petaling Jaya: ‘K’ Publishing & Distributors Sdn. Bhd., 1984, 82 pages.
 Malang Tak Berbau (Peny. Bersama Othman Puteh), Petaling Jaya: ‘K’ Publishing & Distributors Sdn. Bhd., 1984, 54 pages.
 Rahsia Gadis Bisu (Peny. bersama Othman Puteh), Petaling Jaya: ‘K’ Publishing & Distributors Sdn. Bhd., 1984, 61 pages.

Children's Story Books
 Anak Kucing, Petaling Jaya: Penerbit Fajar Bakti Sdn. Bhd., 1983.
 Anak Monyet Mati Ibu, Kuala Lumpur: Eastern Universities Press (M) Sdn. Bhd., 1983.
 Balik Kampung, Petaling Jaya: Penerbit Fajar Bakti Sdn. Bhd., 1983.
 Dua Kali Dibedah, Kuala Lumpur: Eastern Universities Press (M) Sdn. Bhd. 1983.
 Hati Nurani Berdebar, Petaling Jaya: Penerbit Fajar Bakti Sdn. Bhd., 1983.
 Lauk Kenduri, Kuala Lumpur: Eastern Universities Press (M) Sdn. Bhd., 1983.
 Sepatu Bola, Petaling Jaya: Penerbit Fajar Bakti Sdn. Bhd., 1983.
 Tak Susah Sebut ‘R’, Kuala Lumpur: Eastern Universities Press (M) Sdn. Bhd., 1983.
 Siri Citra Sang Unggas: ‘K’ Publishing & Distributors Sdn. Bhd., 2009
 Dendam Helang
 Jalak... O..Jalak
 Hati Kera
 Helah Murai
 Gagak Putih
Siri Cerita Rakyat Si Awang: ‘K’ Publishing & Distributors Sdn. Bhd.
 Awang dengan Tempayan Buruk
 Awang Lidi Sebatang
 Awang dengan Bapa Burung
 Awang Kenit
 Awang dengan Gergasi
Siri Insan Madani: ‘K’ Publishing & Distributors Sdn. Bhd.,
 Balasan Tsklabah
 500 Tahun Beribadat
 Allah Pencipta Alam
 Pembukaan Kota Makkah
 Kasih Sejati
Siri Kembara Sang Kancil 1: ‘K’ Publishing & Distributors Sdn. Bhd.,
 Sang Bedal yang Bebal
 Buluh Berjasa
 Kepingin Mentimun Muda
Siri Kembara Sang Kancil 2: ‘K’ Publishing & Distributors Sdn. Bhd.,
 Gong Berdengung
 Benkung Bernyawa
 Dendam Belum Berakhir
Siri Kembara Sang Kancil 3: ‘K’ Publishing & Distributors Sdn. Bhd.,
 Sang Bedal Tak Berbudi
 Mati Hidup Semula
 Taring Berbisa
Siri Kembara Sang Kancil 4: ‘K’ Publishing & Distributors Sdn. Bhd.,
 Kenduri Besar
 Cikgu Sang Kancil
 Langit Nak Runtuh
Siri Kembara Sang Kancil 5: ‘K’ Publishing & Distributors Sdn. Bhd.,
 Kecundang Sudahnya
 Bakal Pengantin
 Hidangan istimewa
Siri Legenda: ‘K’ Publishing & Distributors Sdn. Bhd.,
 Si Tanggang
 Batu Belah Batu Bertangkup
 Badang
 Puteri Gunung Ledang
 Bawang Putih Bawang Merah, Kuala Lumpur
Siri Teladan dari Rimba: ‘K’ Publishing & Distributors Sdn. Bhd.,
 Helah Si Bangau Tua
 Singa Vegetarian
 Jasa Tikus dan Semut Hitam
 Burung Hantu Tertipu
 Gajah dan Ular Buta
Siri Aura Fauna, ‘K’ Publishing & Distributors Sdn. Bhd., 2008
 Semut Melancong ke Pulau  Pinang
 Sedap Rumput Enak Lagi Lobak
 Rama-rama Nakal
 Itik dan Buaya
 Mencari Damai
Siri Sukabaca, ‘K’ Publishing & Distributors Sdn. Bhd., 2010
 Angsa Berjasa
 Arnab Buta
 Misi Katak ke Angkasa
 Ikan Emas Mangsa Banjir
 Taat Anjing Manja si Kucing
The Best Story Ever Told About Series:  ‘K’ Publishing & Distributors Sdn. Bhd.,
 The Boy and the Giant
 The Boy from the Coconut
 The Boy and the Parrot
 The Boy Who Passed the Test
 The Boy Who Couldn't Lift the Axe
Siri Pantun Kanak-kanak :   ‘K’ Publishing & Distributors Sdn. Bhd.,
 Mari Berpantun 1
 Mari Berpantun 2
 Mari Berpantun 4

Poetry
 808 Pantun Baru, Kuala Lumpur:  ‘K’ Publishing & Distributors Sdn. Bhd., 1997
 1001 Pantun Baru, Kuala Lumpur:  ‘K’ Publishing & Distributors Sdn. Bhd., 1999
 Mastika Warisan, Kuala Lumpur:  ‘K’ Publishing & Distributors Sdn. Bhd., 2005
 1010 Pantun Baru, Kuala Lumpur:  ‘K’ Publishing & Distributors Sdn. Bhd., 2010

Collection of Youth Literatures
 Cerdik Tak Berakal (Peny.), Kuala Lumpur: ‘K’ Publishing & Distributors Sdn. Bhd., 1985, 87 pages.
 Ibuku Sayang (Peny.) Kuala Lumpur: ‘K’ Publishing & Distributors Sdn. Bhd., 1985, 90 pages.
 Sayang Telani (Peny.), Kuala Lumpur: ‘K’ Publishing & Distributors Sdn. Bhd., 1985, pages.

Poem
 Semerbak Puisi, Kuala Lumpur: ‘K’ Publishing & Distributors Sdn. Bhd., 2004
 Dua Dimensi Khadijah Hashim (sajak dan lukisan berus Cina), Kuala Lumpur: ‘K’ Publishing & Distributors Sdn. Bhd.,2008
 Puisi Tunas Bangsa, Kuala Lumpur: ‘K’ Publishing & Distributors Sdn. Bhd., 2008
 Putera-puteri Malaysia, ‘K’ Publishing & Distributors Sdn. Bhd., 2010

Studies
 Panduan Menulis Skrip Drama Radio, Kuala Lumpur: ‘K’ Publishing & Distributors, 1986, 136 pages

References

External links
 Khadijah Hashim di DBP.
 

Malaysian novelists
Malaysian journalists
Malaysian children's writers
1942 births
Living people
Malaysian women writers
Malaysian women journalists
Malaysian women novelists
Malaysian women poets
Malaysian women children's writers
S.E.A. Write Award winners
International Writing Program alumni
People from Johor
20th-century journalists
21st-century journalists
20th-century novelists
21st-century novelists
20th-century Malaysian poets
21st-century Malaysian poets
20th-century Malaysian women writers
21st-century Malaysian women writers